A number of world records and Olympic records were set in various events at the 2012 Summer Olympics in London. 32 world records were broken in eight sports. The largest number of world records was set in swimming, with eight. China, Great Britain and the United States set the most records, with five each.

Olympic and World records set by sport

Archery

Athletics

Cycling

Shooting

Swimming

Men

Women

Weightlifting

Women

Men

World records set by date

References

2012 Summer Olympics
2012 Summer Olympics